Friedrich "Fritz" Horn (born 1909, date of death unknown) was a German field hockey player who competed in the 1928 Summer Olympics in which Germany beat Belgium 3-0 to earn the bronze medal.

He was a member of the German field hockey team, which won the bronze medal. He played two matches as forward.

External links
 
Fritz Horn's profile at databaseOlympics.com

1909 births
Year of death missing
Field hockey players at the 1928 Summer Olympics
German male field hockey players
Olympic bronze medalists for Germany
Olympic field hockey players of Germany
Olympic medalists in field hockey
Medalists at the 1928 Summer Olympics